Taunsa (Urdu, Balochi, Punjabi,) is a city in Taunsa District of Punjab province of Pakistan and capital of this district.

Location
Taunsa Sharif is located on the Karachi-Peshawar Highway, which is also known as Indus Highway. Taunsa is also the location of one of the headworks on the Indus River called Taunsa Barrage, located 16 kilometres south of Taunsa Sharif city.

Taunsa Barrage
Taunsa is also the location of one of the notable structures on the Indus River called Taunsa Barrage, located several kilometres south of Taunsa city. It was designated a Ramsar site on March 22, 1996. The Taunsa Barrage was completed in 1958, and it has been identified as the barrage with the highest priority for rehabilitation. It requires urgent measures to avoid severe economic and social impacts on the lives of millions of poor farmers through interruption of irrigation on two million acres (8,000 km²) and drinking water in the rural areas of southern Punjab, benefiting several million farmers.
In 2003, the World Bank approved a $123 million loan to Pakistan to rehabilitate the Taunsa Barrage on the River Indus whose structure had been damaged owing to soil erosions and old-age. The project was designed to ensure irrigation of the cultivated lands in the area of the Muzaffargarh and Dera Ghazi Khan Tehsil canals, and through the Taunsa-Panjnad Link Canal that supplements the water supply to Panjnad head-works canals.

Taunsa Barrage also serves to provide for a variety of fish, which contributes towards fulfilling the food related needs of area.

References

Taunsa District
Populated places in Taunsa District